Akyaka is a village in the Burdur District of Burdur Province in Turkey. Its population is 184 (2021).

References

Villages in Burdur District